Deliberate destruction and theft of cultural heritage has been conducted by the Islamic State since 2014 in Iraq, Syria, and to a lesser extent in Libya. The destruction targets various places of worship under ISIL control and ancient historical artifacts. In Iraq, between the fall of Mosul in June 2014 and February 2015, IS had plundered and destroyed at least 28 historical religious buildings. Valuable items from some buildings were looted in order to smuggle and sell them to foreigners to finance the running of the Islamic State.

Motivation

IS justifies the destruction of cultural heritage sites by its Salafism, which, according to its followers, places "great importance on establishing tawhid (monotheism)", and "eliminating shirk (polytheism)". Thus there is an ideological underpinning to their destruction of historical and cultural heritage sites. IS views its actions in sites like Palmyra and Nimrud as being in accordance with Sunni Islamic tradition.

Beyond the ideological aspects of the destruction, there are other, more practical, reasons behind IS's destruction of historic sites. Grabbing the world's attention is easily done through the destruction of such sites, given the extensive media coverage and international condemnation that comes afterwards. Destroying historic ruins also allows IS to wipe the slate clean and to start afresh, leaving no traces of any previous culture or civilization, while also providing an ideal platform for the group to establish its own identity and leave its mark on history. Despite the images showing extreme destruction, ISIL has also been making use of the looted antiquities to finance their activities. Despite the UN's ban on the trade of artifacts looted from Syria since 2011, the group has been smuggling these artifacts out of the Middle East and on to the underground antique markets of Europe and North America.

Destroyed heritage

Mosques and shrines
In 2014, media reported destruction of multiple religious buildings belonging to both Sunni and Shia sects throughout areas captured by ISIL. Among them were the tomb of Ibn al-Athir, Imam Abbas Mosque in Mosul, the Sheikh Jawad Al-Sadiq Mosque, Tomb of Sayyid Ar-Mamut Baba, Qaddo Mosque, Martyrs' Mosque, Saad Ibn Aqeel Shrine in Tal Afar, the Sufi Ahmed al-Rifai Shrine and Sheikh Ibrahim's shrine in Mahlabiya District.

In Mosul, ISIL also targeted several tombs with shrines built over them. In July 2014, ISIL destroyed one of the tombs of prophet Daniel (also in Mosul) with explosives. On 24 July 2014, the tomb and mosque of the prophet Jonah was also destroyed with explosives. On 25 July 2014, the 13th-century shrine of Imam Awn al-Din in Mosul, one of the few structures to have survived the 13th-century Mongol invasion, was destroyed by ISIL. The destruction was mostly carried out with explosives, but in some cases bulldozers were used. On 27 July, ISIL destroyed the tomb of Prophet Jirjis (George).

On 24 September 2014, the Al-Arba'een Mosque in Tikrit, containing forty tombs from the Umar era, was blown up. The building also contained two shrines, one dedicated to Sitt Nafisa and the other dedicated to Amr ibn Jundab al-Ghafari.

On 26 February 2015, ISIL blew up the 12th century Green Mosque in central Mosul.

In March 2015, ISIL bulldozed to the ground the Hamu Al-Qadu Mosque in Mosul, dating back to 1880. The Hamu-Al-Qadu mosque contained an earlier tomb of Ala-al-din Ibn Abdul Qadir Gilani. In the same year ISIL ordered the removal of all decorative elements and frescoes from mosques in Mosul, even those containing Quranic verses that mention Allah. They were described by ISIL as "an erroneous form of creativity, contradicting the basics of sharia". At least one imam in Mosul opposing that order was shot to death.

In 2016, ISIL destroyed the Minaret of Anah in Al Anbar Province, which dates back to the Abbasid Caliphate. The minaret was only rebuilt in 2013 after its destruction by an unknown perpetrator during the Iraqi Civil War in 2006.

In 2017, ISIL destroyed the Great Mosque of al-Nuri and its leaning minaret. This was the mosque where ISIL leader Abu Bakr al-Baghdadi declared the establishment of the Islamic State caliphate three years prior.

Churches and monasteries

In June 2014, it was reported that ISIL elements had been instructed to destroy all churches in Mosul. Since then, most churches within the city have been destroyed.
 The Virgin Mary Church was destroyed with several improvised explosive devices in July 2014.
 Dair Mar Elia, the oldest monastery in Iraq, was demolished sometime between late August and September 2014. The destruction went unreported until January 2016.
 The Al-Tahera Church, built in the early 20th century, was possibly blown up in early February 2015. However, there is no evidence that the church was actually destroyed.
 St Markourkas Church, a 10th-century Chaldean Catholic church, was destroyed on 9 March 2015, according to the Iraqi government official Dureid Hikmat Tobia. A nearby cemetery was also bulldozed.
 Another church, which was reportedly "thousands of years" old, was blown up in July 2015. According to Kurdish sources, four children were inadvertently killed when the church was destroyed.
 The Sa'a Qadima Church, which was built in 1872, was blown up in April 2016.

ISIL also blew up or demolished a number of other churches elsewhere in Iraq or in Syria. The Armenian Genocide Memorial Church in Deir ez-Zor, Syria was blown up by ISIL militants on 21 September 2014.

On 24 September 2014 ISIL militants destroyed with improvised explosive devices the 7th-century Green Church (also known as St Ahoadamah Church) belonging to the Assyrian Church of the East in Tikrit.

The Mar Behnam Monastery in Khidr Ilyas near Bakhdida, Iraq was destroyed by ISIL in March 2015.

On 4 May 2015, ISIL were reported to have destroyed the Assyrian Christian Virgin Mary Church on Easter Sunday (5 April) in the Syrian town of Tel Nasri. "As the 'joint forces' of Kurdish People's Protection Units and local Assyrian fighters attempted to enter the town", ISIL set off the explosives destroying what remained of the church. ISIL had controlled the church since 7 March 2015.

On 21 August 2015, the historic Monastery of St. Elian near Al-Qaryatayn in the Homs Governorate was destroyed by ISIL.

Ancient and medieval sites

In May 2014, ISIL members smashed a 3,000-year-old neo-Assyrian statue from Tel Ajaja. Later reports indicated that over 40% of the artifacts at Tel Ajaja (Saddikanni) were looted by ISIL.

Parts of the Tal Afar Citadel were blown up by ISIL in December 2014, causing extensive damage.

In January 2015, ISIL reportedly destroyed large parts of the Nineveh Wall in al-Tahrir neighborhood of Mosul. Further parts of the walls, including the Mashka and Adad Gate, were blown up in April 2016.

In the Syrian city of Raqqa, ISIL publicly ordered the bulldozing of a colossal ancient Assyrian gateway lion sculpture from the 8th century BC. Another lion statue was also destroyed. Both statues originated from the Arslan Tash archaeological site. The destruction was published in the ISIL magazine, Dabiq. Among the lost statues are those of Mulla Uthman al-Mawsili, of a woman carrying an urn, and of Abu Tammam.

On 26 February 2015, ISIL released a video showing the destruction of various ancient artifacts in the Mosul Museum. The affected artifacts originate from the Assyrian era and from the ancient city of Hatra. The video in particular shows the defacement of a granite lamassu statue from the right side of the Nergal Gate by a jackhammer. Several other defaced items in the museum were claimed to be copies, but this was later rebutted by Iraq's Minister of Culture, Adel Sharshab who said: "Mosul Museum had many ancient artifacts, big and small. None of them were transported to the National Museum of Iraq in Baghdad. Thus, all artifacts destroyed in Mosul are original except for four pieces that were made of gypsum".

On 5 March 2015, ISIL reportedly started the demolition of Nimrud, an Assyrian city from the 13th century BC. The local palace was bulldozed, while lamassu statues at the gates of the palace of Ashurnasirpal II were smashed. A video showing the destruction of Nimrud was released in April 2015. By the time the city was retaken by government forces, 90% of the excavated zone of Nimrud, including Ashurbanipal II's palace, the ziggurat, and its Lamassu statues had been completely destroyed. Since the city's destruction, The Nimrud Rescue Project, funded by the Smithsonian, has worked two seasons on location to train local Iraqi archaeologists and protect and conserve the remains. So far the project has largely been successful in documenting and collecting the remaining artifacts and reliefs; plans for reconstruction are also in the works.

On 7 March 2015, Kurdish sources reported that ISIL had begun the bulldozing of Hatra, which has been under threat of demolition after ISIL had occupied the adjacent area. The next day ISIL attacked Kurdish Peshmerga forces at Dur-Sharrukin, according to a Kurdish official from Mosul, Saeed Mamuzini. Most of the damage was done by the Peshmerga forces trying to militarize the site against ISIL. Only one looting tunnel was dug at the site.

The Iraqi Tourism and Antiquities Ministry launched the related investigation on the same day. On 8 April 2015, the Iraqi Ministry of Tourism reported that ISIL destroyed the remnants of the 12th-century Bash Tapia Castle in Mosul. In early July 2015, 20% of Iraq's 10,000 archaeological sites were under ISIL control.

In 2015 the face of the Winged Bull of Nineveh was damaged.

Palmyra

Following the capture of Palmyra in Syria, ISIL was reported as not intending to demolish the city's World Heritage Site (while still intending to destroy any statues deemed 'polytheistic'). On 27 May 2015, ISIL released an 87-second video showing parts of the apparently undamaged ancient colonnades, the Temple of Bel and the Roman theatre. On 27 June 2015, however, ISIL demolished the ancient Lion of Al-lāt statue in Palmyra. (It has since been restored, and is in storage in a Damascus museum until it can be determined that the statue can be safely returned to Palmyra.) Several other statues from Palmyra reportedly confiscated from a smuggler were also destroyed by ISIL. On 23 August 2015, it was reported that ISIL had blown up the 1st-century Temple of Baalshamin. On 30 August 2015, ISIL demolished the Temple of Bel with explosives. Satellite imagery of the site taken shortly after showed almost nothing remained.

According to the report issued on 3 September 2015 by ASOR Syrian Heritage initiative, ISIL also destroyed seven ancient tower tombs in Palmyra since the end of June over two phases. The last phase of destruction occurred between 27 August and 2 September 2015, including the destruction of the 2nd-century AD Tower of Elahbel, called "the most prominent example of Palmyra's distinct funerary monuments". Earlier, the ancient tombs of Iamliku and Atenaten were also destroyed. The Monumental Arch was also blown up in October.

When Palmyra was recaptured by Syrian government forces in March 2016, retreating ISIL fighters blew up parts of the 13th-century Palmyra Castle, causing extensive damage.

ISIL also continued the looting and demolition of the Parthian/Roman city of Dura-Europos begun by looters during the Syrian Civil War. Nicknamed "the Pompeii of the desert", the city was of particular archaeological significance.

It was reported on 1 January 2019 that Syrian authorities recovered two Roman-era funerary busts smuggled from Palmyra from an abandoned ISIL site in the Al-Sukhnah countryside.

Hatra
Hatra was an ancient city in the Ninawa Governorate and al-Jazira region of Iraq. A large fortified city and capital of the first Arab Kingdom, later it became a Persian client state. Hatra withstood invasions by the Romans in A.D. 116 and 198 thanks to its high, thick walls reinforced by towers. About 240 CE, the city fell to Shāpūr I (reigned c. 240–272), the ruler of the Persian Sāsānian dynasty, and was destroyed. The remains of the city, especially the temples where Hellenistic and Roman architecture blend with Eastern decorative features, attest to the greatness of its civilization.

On 7 March 2015, various sources including Iraqi officials reported that ISIL had begun demolishing the ruins of Hatra. Video released by ISIL the next month showed destruction of the monuments. The ancient city was recaptured by the Popular Mobilization Forces on 26 April 2017. Though most of Hatra's temples were relatively unharmed, their interior scriptures and art had been smashed and looted by ISIS forces.

Libraries

ISIL has burned or stolen collections of books and papers from various locations, including the Central Library of Mosul (which they rigged with explosives and burned down); the library at the University of Mosul; a Sunni Muslim library; a 265-year-old Latin Church and Monastery of the Dominican Fathers; and the Mosul Museum Library. Some destroyed or stolen works date back to 5000 BC and include "Iraq newspapers dating to the early 20th century, maps and books from the Ottoman Empire, and book collections contributed by about 100 of Mosul's establishment families". The stated goal is to destroy all non-Islamic books.

Response
On 22 September 2014, the United States Secretary of State John Kerry announced that the Department of State had partnered with the American Schools of Orient Research Cultural Heritage Initiatives to "comprehensively document the condition of, and threats to, cultural heritage sites in Iraq and Syria to assess their future restoration, preservation, and protection needs". In 2014, the UNESCO's Committee for the Protection of Cultural Property in the Event of Armed Conflict condemned at the Ninth Meeting "repeated and deliberate attacks against cultural property... in particular in the Syrian Arab Republic and the Republic of Iraq". UNESCO Director-General Irina Bokova called the destructions in Mosul a violation of the United Nations Security Council Resolution 2199, and the destruction of Nimrud a war crime.

Former Prime Minister of Iraq Nouri al-Maliki reported that the local parliamentary tourism and antiquities committee had "filed complaints with the UN to condemn all ISIL crimes and abuses, including those that affect ancient places of worship". On 28 May 2015, the United Nations General Assembly unanimously passed a resolution, initiated by Germany and Iraq and sponsored by 91 UN member states, stating that ISIL's destruction of cultural heritage may amount to a war crime and urging international measures to halt such acts, which it described as a "tactic of war".

After the Palmyra temple's destruction in August 2015, the Institute for Digital Archaeology (IDA) announced plans to establish a digital record of historical sites and artifacts threatened by ISIL advance. To accomplish this goal, the IDA, in collaboration with UNESCO, will deploy 5,000 3D cameras to partners in the Middle East. The cameras will be used to capture 3D scans of local ruins and relics.

The general director of the Czech National Museum, Michal Lukeš, signed an agreement in June 2017 committing the institution to help Syria save, preserve and conserve much of its cultural and historical heritage damaged by war, including the ancient site of Palmyra; he met with Maamoun Abdulkarim and discussed plans for the works that are said to last until 2019.

In June 2017, The World Monuments Fund (WMF) announced launching a £500,000 scheme to train Syrian refugees near the Syrian-Jordanian border in traditional stone masonry. The aim is teaching them to develop skills necessary to be able to help in restoring cultural heritage sites that have been damaged or destroyed during the Syrian Civil War once peace is restored to Syria.

Minor restorations have already begun: Palmyrene funerary busts of a deceased man and a woman, damaged and defaced by ISIL, were taken from Palmyra, then to Beirut to be sent off to Rome. Italian experts restored the portraits using 3D technology to print resin prosthetics, which were coated with a thick layer of stone dust to blend in with the original stone; the prosthetics were attached to the damaged faces of the busts using strong magnets. The restored pieces are now back in Syria. Abdulkarim said the restoration of the busts "is the first real, visible positive step that the international community has taken to protect Syrian heritage".

However, the Rewards for Justice Program offers up to $5 million for information leading to disrupt the sale and/or trade of oil and antiquities by ISIL.

See also
 Archaeological looting in Iraq
 Buddhas of Bamiyan – Buddhist sculptures demolished by the Taliban in Afghanistan in 2001
 Destruction of early Islamic heritage sites in Saudi Arabia
 Islamist destruction of Timbuktu heritage sites in Mali in 2012
 List of destroyed heritage
 List of heritage sites damaged during the Syrian Civil War (since 2011)

References

Bibliography

External links
 ISIL destroyed and damaged sites September 1, 2015 National Geographic
 ISIL and Antiquities Trafficking – FBI Warns Dealers, Collectors About Terrorist Loot

Aniconism
Iraqi culture
Syrian culture
Libyan culture
Islamic State of Iraq and the Levant activities
Vandalism
2014 in Iraq
2014 in Syria
2015 in Iraq
2015 in Syria
2015 in Libya
2016 in Iraq
2016 in Syria
Cultural heritage
War crimes
Syrian civil war crimes
 
Culture-related controversies
Historical negationism
Persecution of Christians by Muslims
Islamist attacks on churches
Iconoclasm
2014 disasters in Asia
2015 disasters in Asia
2016 disasters in Asia 
2010s disasters in Iraq
2010s disasters in Syria
Disasters in Libya